Abyss Lake is a lake in southeastern Alaska. Lying on the eastern side of the Brady Glacier, it receives meltwater from it, which in turn flows into the Dundas River, Dundas Bay, Cross Sound and thence into the Pacific.

A part of the Glacier Bay National Park and Preserve, its water is regularly blocked by an ice dam.  When such a dam breaks in a glacial lake outburst flood, much of the lake's water is propelled into Dundas Bay, along with trees, ice chunks, and sediment.  This has happened in 1994, 1997, 1998, 2000, 2001, 2005, and again in September 2006.

References

External links
Ready to burst? Southeast and Southcentral Alaska lead the world in glacial floods
Visitor Use Advisory for Western Arm of Dundas Bay

Bodies of water of Hoonah–Angoon Census Area, Alaska
Lakes of Alaska